Universitas Internasional Batam (International University of Batam) is a university which is located in Batam Island, Riau Islands Province, Indonesia. It was established in the year 2000 in accordance with the Decree of National Education Ministry of Indonesian Republic No. 160/D/O/2000 by Yayasan Marga Tionghoa Indonesia (YMTI), an organization of Tionghoa people in Indonesia.

Academic Program
There are 5 schools in Universitas Internasional Batam with 21 majors.

International Partners 

 Universitas Internasional Batam collaborates with several well-known international universities as an action to achieve international oriented university status:

 South Korea
Catholic University of Daegu (CUD)
Hanbat National University (HNU)
Woosong University
Sunmoon University(SMU)
Dong-A University
Youngsan University
Kangwon National University
Dong Seo University
Jeju National University
Jeonju University
 China
Nanjing Xiaozhuang University
Jiangsu University
Guang Xi University
Xiamen University
Nanjing Polytechnic Institute
Soochow University
Capital University of Economics and Business Beijing
Chongqing University
Taiwan
National Taiwan University of Science and Technology (NTUST)
National Tsing Hua University (NTHU)
Tunghai University
I-Shou University (ISU)
Ming Chuan University
Ming Chi University of Technology
National Yunlin University of Science and Technology
Japan
Kanagawa Institute of Technology
Tochigi International Education Institute
Okutama Bridge Institute of Technology
Malaysia
Universiti Sains Malaysia (USM)
Universiti Teknikal Malaysia Melaka (UTEM)
Universiti of Malaya
Universiti Teknologi Malaysia
Thailand
King Mongkut University of Technology Thonburi
Bhurapa University International College
Raja Manggala University of Technology Thanyaburi
Other Countries
FPT University of Vietnam
National Polytechnic Institute of Cambodia
Amity Global Business School India
Northeastern State University
International Management Institute Switzerland

Icon 

UIB logo which is created in blue-navy, white and orange composition, represents the vision and mission of the campus.

1. The yellow curved shape above the word UIB represents WORLD SPHERE, which means:

a. One of UIB’s vision: to become a world class university.
	b. UIB’s is a multiracial and multicultural university.
	c. UIB develops and implements the knowledge and dedication for humanity without limits.

2. The word “UIB” in white color below the curved shape represents RELIGIOUS AND HUMBLE, which means:

a. UIB always base their works on faith and humbleness under the guidance of ‘The Creator’.
	b. UIB commits to implement knowledge for human welfare.

3. The clockwise and ascending end of each letter represents the TIME and IMPROVEMENT, which means:

a. The dimension of life time.
	b. Today is better than the past, the future is better that the present.
	c. UIB is developing towards being a world class university.
	d. Lifelong Learning.

4. The composition of the blue-navy square represents:

a. Confidence.
	b. Hospitality.
	c. Aesthetic.

References

External links 
 Official site
 Budi Prayitno - Associate Lecturer

batam
Buildings and structures in the Riau Islands
Universities in Indonesia